Bruce Morrison (19 June 1923 – 12 April 2012) was an Australian rules footballer who played for the Geelong Football Club in the Victorian Football League (VFL).

"Joey" Morrison was recruited from Bairnsdale, Victoria after winning the 1947 Gippsland Football League best and fairest, Trood award and a best on ground performance in their 1947 premiership win against Sale.

Morrison became a highly regarded full-back for the Geelong Football Club. He played 130 games for Geelong and won a string of awards in his first season of VFL football, winning the 1948 club best and fairest, best first year player, Geelong Workers Club best and fairest award and the Geelong Advertiser Trophy. 

He was well remembered for a particular kick against the Footscray at Whitten Oval. When he was playing at full-back, he tried to kick the ball out after a behind was scored but the wind was so strong that when he kicked the ball it floated over his head and through the goals. The goal umpire signalled it as a rushed behind.

References

External links

Geelong Football Club players
Geelong Football Club Premiership players
Carji Greeves Medal winners
1923 births
2012 deaths
People from Bairnsdale
Australian rules footballers from Victoria (Australia)
Bairnsdale Football Club players
Two-time VFL/AFL Premiership players